Myeloid cell Nuclear Differentiation Antigen is a protein that in humans is encoded as MNDA gene.

Function 

The myeloid cell nuclear differentiation antigen (MNDA) is detected only in nuclei of cells of the granulocyte-monocyte lineage. A 200-amino acid region of human MNDA is strikingly similar to a region in the proteins encoded by a family of interferon-inducible mouse genes, designated Ifi-201, Ifi202, and Ifi-203, that are not regulated in a cell- or tissue-specific fashion. The 1.8-kb MNDA mRNA, which contains an interferon-stimulated response element in the 5' UTR, was significantly upregulated in human monocytes exposed to interferon alpha. MNDA is located within 2,200 kb of FCER1A, APCS, CRP, and SPTA1. In its pattern of expression and/or regulation, MNDA resembles IFI16, suggesting that these genes participate in blood cell-specific responses to interferons.

References

Further reading

External links 
 

Transcription factors